Hugo Nathan (1861-1921) was a German banker and art collector.

Life 
Hugo Nathan was a director at the Deutsche Bank in Frankfurt am Main. 

He married Martha Adrianna Nathan.

He died in 1921.

Art Collection 
Nathan collected art. His collection included Dutch art (Josef Israels, "Alte Frau"), German art, with works by Max Liebermann ("Schreitende Bauerné, 1894/95, "Selbstbildnis" 1908, "Reiter am Meeresstrand" 1901, "Schulgang in Laren" 1899,), Wilhelm Trübner ("Kunstpause", "Brustbild einer Frau", "Blick auf Kloster Seon", "Kirchengang im Klster Seeon", "Atelierecke", "Waldinneres", "Vorgang ds Stift Neuburg", "Weg am Buchenwald", "Neustift bei Heidelberg", "Screinerwerkstatt") and Max Slevoft ("Spaziergan"), as well as Swiss art by Ferdinand Hodler (Aussicht vom Thunersee bei Niesen" 1876, "Jungfrau, Mönch und Eiger", "Mönch in Abendbeleuchtung").

In 1912 he purchased Van Gogh's The Diggers. In 1913, he lent artworks to an exhibition at the Kunstverein (July-September) entitled Frankfurter Kunstschatze.

Family and Nazi persecution 
When the Nazis came to power in Germany in 1933, Nathan's widow Martha was persecuted because of her Jewish heritage.  In January 1937, she fled Germany and moved to Paris, France where she obtained French citizenship. She returned briefly to Germany around May 1938 to sell her house, and was forced by the Nazi government to transfer six paintingsremaining in her home to the Staedel Art Institute. She moved to Switzerland around 1939. After the Nazis occupied Paris in 1940, property that she had managed to store there was seized too She had managed, however, to move some paintings to safety Switzerland. The circumstances surrounding the sale of these paintings have been disputed in lawsuits.

Postwar claims for restitution 
In May 2004, Nathan's heir contacted the Detroit Institute of Arts after seeing Van Gogh's The Diggers on the museum website. The museum argued that a claim was time barred. Nathan's heirs also contacted the Toledo Museum of Art requesting the return of a Gauguin that she had sold in 1938 to three dealers. The Toledo Museum of Art filed a lawsuit against Nathan's heirs.

In 2013, Simon J. Frankel and Ethan Forrest defended the museums' use of legal tactics such as declaratory judgement  against Nathan.  

In 2015, the World Jewish Restitution Organization (WJRO) criticized the use of  procedural defenses by museums and cited the Nathan case as an example.

Lawsuits concerning Hugo and Martha Nathan's art collection 
Toledo Museum of Art v Claude George Ullin, et al.,

References 

1861 births
1921 deaths